

Australian Capital Territory

This is a list of electoral division results for the 2016 Australian federal election in the Australian Capital Territory.

Overall results

Results by division

Canberra

Fenner

Northern Territory

This is a list of electoral division results for the 2016 Australian federal election in the Northern Territory.

Overall results

Country Liberal to Labor: Solomon

Results by division

Lingiari

Solomon

External territories

Christmas Island

References

Notes

Territories 2016